Lower Columbia College (LCC) is a public community college in Longview, Washington.

History 
Lower Columbia College was established in 1934 as Lower Columbia Junior College. Students registered for classes at Korten's Music Store in Longview, Dahlman Hardware in Castle Rock, and the Orr Furniture Store in Kelso. Classes were held at R.A. Long High School. The first class to graduate with an Associate degree was in 1936; the class consisted of seven students.

The second class, with ninety-six students, graduated in 1937. As the number of students increased, instruction expanded into the Myklebust building in downtown Longview and the Moose Hall. The Moose Hall continued to house classes until the 1949 Olympia earthquake, when damage caused the building to be condemned. Classes were also held on the first floor of the Longview Public Library.

Enrollment was 149 students in 1939, 200 students in 1950, and 300 students in 1954. The student population consisted of both male and female students. In 1948, the college received its first accreditation from the Northwest Commission on Colleges and Universities.

In 1942, twenty-six acres were purchased from the Longview Company to build a campus. In 1950, construction began on Old Main, LCC's first permanent building. The original building had thirteen classrooms and cost a quarter of a million dollars. The Lower Columbia College League, an association of friends of the college, used fundraising to pay for the construction.

Lower Columbia Junior College became part of the Longview School District and changed from a junior college to a community college in 1961. LCC joined the state-supported community college system in 1967. Today, the college includes twenty-six buildings on 38.75 acres and enrolls between 4,000 and 5,000 students each quarter.

Foundation 
The Lower Columbia College Foundation was formed in 1976 with the help of Phillip and Jeanne Wertheimer.

University partnerships 
Students can earn bachelor's and master's degrees through the Lower Columbia Regional University Center located on the Lower Columbia College campus.  Partner universities include: 
 City University of Seattle
 Warner Pacific University
 Washington State University Vancouver

Academics 
Lower Columbia College offers a selection of degree and certificate programs designed to prepare students for advanced studies or to move directly into the workforce.

Activities and events 
The Associated Students of Lower Columbia College (ASLCC), along with faculty and staff at the college, plan student and community events throughout the year. Students participate in events, activities, clubs and organizations both on and off campus. Activities and event dates are posted on the Events Calendar and the Student Activities web page.

Athletics 
Lower Columbia College participates in the Northwest Athletic Conference (NWAC). Prior to the formation of the NWAACC, LCC was one of the charter members of the original Washington State Junior College Athletic Conference *(WSJCAC).

LCC competes in six intercollegiate sports: two men's teams and four women's teams.

Men – NWAC Champions  
 Baseball – 1970, 1981, 1984, 1990, 1992, 1995, 1996, 1997, 2005, 2010, 2015, 2017, 2018, 2019
 Basketball – 1954*, 2004, 2005

Women – NWAC Champions  
 Basketball – None
 Soccer – None
 Softball – 1994, 1999–2004, 2006–2008.
 Volleyball – 1991, 2016

David Story Field, home of the Red Devils baseball team, is also home to the Cowlitz Black Bears of the West Coast League, a summer collegiate and professional prospect league.

Notable alumni
 Bud Black - Major League Baseball manager for Colorado Rockies
 Billy Jones - Head baseball coach at Appalachian State
 Joe Kraemer - Former Major League Baseball pitcher for the Chicago Cubs
 Bas Nooij - Professional baseball player in the Dutch Baseball League
 Krist Novoselic - Musician, former Nirvana bassist
 Sid Snyder - Former politician and businessman
 Rick Sweet - Minor League Baseball manager for the Louisville Bats, the top Cincinnati Reds farm club
 Pim Walsma - Baseball player for the Dutch National Team

References

External links

 

Longview, Washington
Education in Cowlitz County, Washington
Community colleges in Washington (state)
Universities and colleges accredited by the Northwest Commission on Colleges and Universities
Educational institutions established in 1934
Two-year colleges in the United States
Buildings and structures in Cowlitz County, Washington
1934 establishments in Washington (state)